The T. P. Bowlby Barn, northeast of Buhl, Idaho, was built in 1912 by Henry Schick, a German-Russian immigrant to the United States.  It was listed on the National Register of Historic Places in 1983.

References

Barns on the National Register of Historic Places in Idaho
Buildings and structures completed in 1912
Buildings and structures in Twin Falls County, Idaho
German-Russian culture in Idaho
1912 establishments in Idaho
National Register of Historic Places in Twin Falls County, Idaho